The 2011 India Open Grand Prix also known as Yonex–Sunrise Syed Modi Memorial India Open Grand Prix Gold was a badminton tournament which took place at Babu Banarasi Das Indoor Stadium in Lucknow, India from 20 to 25 December 2011 and had a total purse of $120,000. This is for the first time this tournament was graded as a Grand Prix Gold event, where before rate as Grand Prix event. This tournament was part of the qualification stage of 2012 Summer Olympics.

Men's singles

Seeds

 Simon Santoso (third round)
 Taufik Hidayat (champion)
 Hans-Kristian Vittinghus (second round)
 Tommy Sugiarto (third round)
 Wong Wing Ki (semi-finals)
 Dionysius Hayom Rumbaka (third round)
 Hu Yun (quarter-finals)
 Alamsyah Yunus (quarter-finals)
 Ajay Jayaram (first round)
 Parupalli Kashyap (second round)
 Hsu Jen-hao (third round)
 Tanongsak Saensomboonsuk (second round)
 Derek Wong (second round)
 R. M. V. Gurusaidutt (third round)
 Daren Liew (withdrew)
 Suppanyu Avihingsanon (semi-finals)

Finals

Women's singles

Seeds

 Saina Nehwal (withdrew)
 Porntip Buranaprasertsuk (final)
 Ratchanok Intanon (champion)
 Eriko Hirose (semi-finals)
 Gu Juan (quarter-finals)
 Pi Hongyan (withdrew)
 Fu Mingtian (withdrew)
 Salakjit Ponsana (withdrew)

Finals

Men's doubles

Seeds

 Naoki Kawamae / Shoji Sato (champion)
 Ingo Kindervater / Johannes Schöttler (semi-finals)
 Ruud Bosch / Koen Ridder (second round)
 K. T. Rupesh Kumar / Sanave Thomas (second round)
 Hendra Aprida Gunawan / Candra Wijaya (first round)
 Bodin Issara / Maneepong Jongjit (quarter-finals)
 Songphon Anugritayawon / Sudket Prapakamol (second round)
 Ow Yao Han / Tan Wee Kiong (semi-finals)

Finals

Women's doubles

Seeds

 Miyuki Maeda / Satoko Suetsuna (final)
 Vita Marissa / Nadya Melati (quarter-finals)
 Jwala Gutta / Ashwini Ponnappa (second round)
 Duanganong Aroonkesorn / Kunchala Voravichitchaikul (second round)

Finals

Mixed doubles

Seeds

 Sudket Prapakamol / Saralee Thoungthongkam (champion)
 Songphon Anugritayawon / Kunchala Voravichitchaikul (second round)
 Chan Peng Soon / Goh Liu Ying (quarter-finals)
 Valiyaveetil Diju / Jwala Gutta (semi-finals)

Finals

References

External links
 Tournament link

Syed Modi International Badminton Championships
India
India Grand Prix
India Open Grand Prix Gold